Beyond Control is the second studio album by Kings Kaleidoscope. BEC Recordings alongside Gospel Song Records released the album on July 1, 2016.

Critical reception

Jeremy Armstrong writes, "Beyond Controls willingness to cascade sound upon sound yet stay musically concise is impressive by any standard." Ryan Barbee states, "Kings Kaleidoscope is justified in receiving well-earned praises for their latest offering." Scott Fryberger describes, "[he's] sure everyone who listens will find something to love in Beyond Control." Lucas Munachen says, "Although a lot will be torn on the band's newest offering, it's still a solid follow-up and worth checking out." Mark Woodhouse responds, "So does it live up to my expectations? Not really. But it’s still growing on me. Beyond Control is an album that will repay with multiple listens, and one that’ll provoke and encourage you, and will leave you wanting more of the good stuff."

Controversy
Beyond Control was released with both explicit and clean versions of the song "A Prayer" and was hotly debated by the band's mainly Christian audience. In a 2018 interview, Kings Kaleidoscope frontman Chad Gardner acknowledged it was controversial but that it was written from a deep personal experience and was expressing raw emotion; "I'm just getting my guts into my songs."

Track listing

Charts

References

2016 albums
BEC Recordings albums